Wilful Youth is a 1927 American silent drama film directed by Dallas M. Fitzgerald and starring Edna Murphy, Kenneth Harlan and Jack Richardson.

Cast
 Edna Murphy as Edna Tavernay 
 Kenneth Harlan as Jack Compton 
 Jack Richardson as Edward Compton 
 Walter Perry as Terrance Clang 
 Jimmy Aubrey as Steve Daley 
 James Florey as Bull Thompson 
 Eugenie Forde as Mrs. Claudia Tavernay 
 Arthur Morrison as Sheriff

References

Bibliography
 Munden, Kenneth White. The American Film Institute Catalog of Motion Pictures Produced in the United States, Part 1. University of California Press, 1997.

External links
 

1927 films
1927 drama films
1920s English-language films
American silent feature films
Silent American drama films
Films directed by Dallas M. Fitzgerald
American black-and-white films
1920s American films